Eucosma flavispecula is a moth of the family Tortricidae. It is found in China (Tianjin, Hebei, Shanxi, Inner Mongolia, Heilongjiang, Zhejiang, Shaanxi, Ningxia), Mongolia, Russia, Kazakhstan and Europe, where it is found in Finland, from Germany to Italy and in Hungary, Romania and Ukraine.

The wingspan is 14–18 mm. Adults are on wing from the end of June to August.

The larvae feed on Centaurea jacea.

External links
 Fauna Europaea
Redalyc. Catalogue of Eucosmini from China

Eucosmini
Moths described in 1964
Moths of Europe